Samuel Lopes da Cunha (born 7 February 1984) is a Brazilian footballer who plays for São Raimundo Esporte Clube (PA).

Biography

Grêmio
A youth product of Grêmio, he signed a 3-year contract in August 2004. He played five matches in the 2005 Copa do Brasil for Grêmio. He also won promotion to the 2006 Campeonato Brasileiro Série A and the Série B. In the 2006 season he was loaned to Juventude. The loan was pre-matured in July and he was transferred to Avaí.

Portuguesa
In January 2007 he joined the Portuguesa for a one-year contract. At Portuguesa, he was known as Samuel Lopes to avoid confusion with his namesake, Samuel.

He scored five goals in the first seven games of the Campeonato Paulista Série A2.  Portuguesa was the champion and was promoted to Série A1. He missed the rest of the state matches after round 21 and his goals stood at five.  In the 2007 Campeonato Brasileiro Série B he played five times.

Vila Nova
He left for the Vila Nova on 5 September. He won promotion to the 2008 Campeonato Brasileiro Série B.

Paysandu
In January 2008 he signed a contract with the Paysandu until the end of Campeonato Paraense. He finished as the runner-up of the second half of the league and the third overall. He scored nine goals in eleven games. He was re-signed by the Paysandu in August, until the end of the 2008 Campeonato Brasileiro Série C. The team failed to advance to the final stage of the Série C (round 19 to 32).

Veranópolis
In January 2009 he returned to Rio Grande do Sul, to join the Veranópolis. The club finished fourth place in the 2009 Campeonato Gaúcho, along with two other Gaúcho teams.

Águia de Marabá
After 6 months of inactivity, he joined the Nacional de Rolândia.  In February he joined the Águia de Marabá until the end of 2010 Campeonato Paraense. The club offered him another contract until the end of the 2010 Campeonato Brasileiro Série C on 12 July.

In January 2011, he extended his contract with the Águia de Marabá for 1 more year. On 23 February 2011, Lance! reported that Samuel was training with the America Football Club and was about to register in the FFERJ, but the deal never materialized.

Honours
Campeonato Paulista Série A2: 2007

Career statistics

Note: State Leagues are marked as League Cup

References

External links
 Profile at Champion Sport (agent company)
 
 Futpedia 

Brazilian footballers
Grêmio Foot-Ball Porto Alegrense players
Esporte Clube Juventude players
Avaí FC players
Associação Portuguesa de Desportos players
Vila Nova Futebol Clube players
Paysandu Sport Club players
Águia de Marabá Futebol Clube players
Association football forwards
Sportspeople from Espírito Santo
1984 births
Living people